Stephen Carlos Lemme (born November 13, 1968) is an American actor, writer, and producer, and one of the members of the Broken Lizard comedy group.

Early life 
Lemme attended The Dalton School, a high school in New York, but after one year transferred to Fountain Valley School in Colorado, graduating in 1987 (in 2017 he was inducted into the Fountain View School Arts Guild).
He attended Colgate University and was a member of the Beta Theta Pi fraternity. Before leaving Colgate, he was part of Charred Goosebeak, a comedy troupe with the future Lizards. He has Argentine ancestry as his father is originally from Argentina. When he was young he got a polio vaccination and in an extremely rare case he developed polio, which resulted in the decay of his right calf muscle.

Filmography

References

External links

1968 births
American male comedians
21st-century American comedians
Broken Lizard
Colgate University alumni
Living people
Male actors from Colorado Springs, Colorado
Writers from Colorado Springs, Colorado